The Journal of Comparative Neurology is a peer-reviewed scientific journal that focuses on neuroscience and related fields, but specifically does not deal with clinical aspects of them. It was established in 1891 and is published by Wiley-Liss. The editor-in-chief is Patrick R. Hof (Icahn School of Medicine at Mount Sinai). From 1904 till 1910 the journal was named Journal of Comparative Neurology and Psychology.

Abstracting and indexing 
The journal is abstracted and indexed in:

According to the Journal Citation Reports, the journal has a 2020 impact factor of 3.215, ranking it 175th out of 273 journals in the category "Neurosciences" and 10th out of 175 journals in the category "Zoology".

References

External links 
 

Neuroscience journals
Publications established in 1891
Wiley-Liss academic journals
Biweekly journals
English-language journals